Loulan J. Pitre Jr. (born December 1961) is a lawyer in New Orleans, Louisiana, who focuses his work on development, construction, and operations of energy, environmental, and infrastructure projects. His law practice includes entity formation and governance, complex land rights issues, construction procurement and management, environmental and coastal permitting issues, and dispute resolution. He was educated at Harvard University (A.B. magna cum laude, 1983) and Harvard Law School (J.D., 1986).  He is Partner in Charge of Kelly Hart Pitre, the Louisiana offices of the Kelly Hart law firm.

Background

Loulan Pitre Jr. attended the highly selective Telluride Association Summer Program in 1978 and was selected as a Presidential Scholar in 1979, one of 121 nationwide. He was also a National Merit Scholar and is an Eagle Scout.  He graduated from South Lafourche High School in 1979.

Pitre Jr. was educated at both Harvard University (A.B. magna cum laude, 1983) and Harvard Law School (J.D., 1986) in Cambridge, Massachusetts.  At Harvard College, Pitre served as co-chair of Dunster House's House Committee, its student governing body.  While in law school, Pitre was selected for a judicial clerkship on the United States Court of Appeals for the Fifth Circuit by the late Judge Albert Tate Jr., but Judge Tate died before the term of the clerkship.  Pitre's Harvard Law School classmates elected him permanent class secretary, and he gave the class address at commencement.  He has served on the board of directors of the Harvard Alumni Association and as president of the Harvard Club of Louisiana.

Legislative elections
As Pitre completed his eight years in the legislature, the Governor-Elect appointed Loulan as Chair of the Transition Advisory Group on Coastal Restoration and Flood Control.  Shortly after Pitre left the state House in 2008, he changed his voter registration to Independent.

References

1961 births
Living people
Louisiana lawyers
American non-fiction writers
Members of the Louisiana House of Representatives
Louisiana Republicans
Louisiana Independents
People from Cut Off, Louisiana
People from New Orleans
Harvard Law School alumni
Tulane University Law School faculty
Cajun people